The Clock in the Hatbox is a 1939 mystery detective novel by Anthony Gilbert, the pen name of British writer Lucy Beatrice Malleson. It is the fifth in her long-running series featuring the shady London lawyer and detective Arthur Crook. It was published during the Golden Age of Detective Fiction. Reviewing it for the Times Literary Supplement, Maurice Percy Ashley noted "The tale is very fairly told.  Mr. Gilbert, whose work has not perhaps always been sufficiently appreciated in the past, has written a thoroughly entertaining story".

Synopsis
One of the jurors at the trial of the attractive Viola Ross, accused largely on circumstantial evidence of smothering her husband, has severe doubts about the case. The lone dissenter on the jury preventing a unanimous verdict of murder, a retrial is ordered. Convinced now of her innocence he engages the solicitor Arthur Crook to investigate the case and discover what really occurred.

References

Bibliography
 Magill, Frank Northen . Critical Survey of Mystery and Detective Fiction: Authors, Volume 2. Salem Press, 1988.
Murphy, Bruce F. The Encyclopedia of Murder and Mystery. Springer, 1999.
 Reilly, John M. Twentieth Century Crime & Mystery Writers. Springer, 2015.

1939 British novels
British mystery novels
British thriller novels
Novels by Anthony Gilbert
Novels set in London
British detective novels
Collins Crime Club books